Acraea eltringhamiana is a butterfly in the family Nymphalidae. It is found in Zambia (from the northern part of the country to Lake Bangweulu) and the south-eastern part of the Democratic Republic of the Congo.

Acraea eltringhamiana is a member of the Acraea acrita species group. The clade members are:
 
Acraea eltringhamiana 
Acraea acrita
Acraea chaeribula
Acraea guluensis
Acraea lualabae
Acraea manca
Acraea pudorina 
Acraea utengulensis
Acraea (group horta) Henning, 1993
Acraea (Acraea) Henning & Williams, 2010,
Acraea (Acraea) (subgroup insignis) Pierre & Bernaud, 2013
Acraea (Acraea)  group egina Pierre & Bernaud, 2014

References

Butterflies described in 1932
eltringhamiana